Tölö IF is a Swedish football club located in Kungsbacka.

Background
Tölö IF currently plays in Division 4 Halland Elit which is the sixth tier of Swedish football. They play their home matches at the Hamravallen in Kungsbacka.

The club is affiliated to Hallands Fotbollförbund. Tölö IF have competed in the Svenska Cupen on 1 occasion and have played 1 match in the competition.

Season to season

Notable players
  Bengt Andersson

Footnotes

External links
 Tölö IF – Official website
 Tölö IF Dam on Facebook

Football clubs in Halland County
1932 establishments in Sweden